Wayne and Cara Black were the defending champions but lost in the second round to Mahesh Bhupathi and Mary Pierce.

Bhupathi and Pierce defeated  Paul Hanley and Tatiana Perebiynis in the final, 6–4, 6–2 to win the mixed doubles tennis title at the 2005 Wimbledon Championships.

Seeds
All seeds received a bye into the second round. 

  Bob Bryan /  Rennae Stubbs (second round)
  Wayne Black /  Cara Black (second round)
  Jonas Björkman /  Lisa Raymond (semifinals)
  Kevin Ullyett /  Liezel Huber (semifinals)
  Mike Bryan /  Martina Navratilova (quarterfinals)
  Todd Woodbridge /  Samantha Stosur (quarterfinals)
  Leoš Friedl /  Janette Husárová (third round)
  Mark Knowles /  Venus Williams (third round)
  Pavel Vízner /  Nicole Pratt (second round)
  Nenad Zimonjić /  Katarina Srebotnik  (third round)
  Jared Palmer /  Corina Morariu  (second round)
  Olivier Rochus /  Kim Clijsters (quarterfinals)
  Julian Knowle /  Anna-Lena Grönefeld (third round)
  Dominik Hrbatý /  Elena Likhovtseva (third round)
  Martin Damm /  Květa Peschke (second round)
  Andy Ram /  Conchita Martínez (third round)

Draw

Finals

Top half

Section 1

Section 2

Bottom half

Section 3

Section 4

References

External links

2005 Wimbledon Championships on WTAtennis.com
2005 Wimbledon Championships – Doubles draws and results at the International Tennis Federation

X=Mixed Doubles
Wimbledon Championship by year – Mixed doubles